Stone Flute is an album by flautist Herbie Mann recorded in 1969 and becoming the first release on Mann's Embryo label.

Reception

The Allmusic site awarded the album 4 stars stating "This is a totally atypical Herbie Mann recording, but one which rewards repeated listening".

Track listing 
All compositions by Herbie Mann except as indicated
 "In Tangier/Paradise Beach" (David Mills/Herbie Mann) - 10:35 		
 "Flying" (George Harrison, John Lennon, Paul McCartney, Ringo Starr) - 5:21
 "Don't You Know The Way (How I Feel About You)" - 5:17
 "Miss Free Spirit" - 12:40
 "Waltz for My Son" - 4:23
 "Pendulum" (William Fischer) - 2:35 
Recorded in New York City at Atlantic Recording Studios on March 18 (track 2) and March 20 (tracks 1 & 6) and at A&R Recording Studios on August 8 (tracks 3-5), 1969

Personnel 
Herbie Mann - flute
Roy Ayers - vibraphone
Sonny Sharrock - guitar 
Ron Carter (tracks 1, 2 & 6), Miroslav Vitouš (tracks 3-5) - bass
Bruno Carr (tracks 1, 2 & 6), Mickey Roker (tracks 3-5) - drums
Peter Dimitriades (tracks 3-5), Emanuel Green (tracks 1, 2 & 6), Gene Orloff (tracks 1, 2 & 6) - violin
Selwart Clarke - violin, viola
Al Brown - viola (tracks 3-5)
Kermit Moore (tracks 3-5), George Ricci (tracks 1, 2 & 6) - cello 
William Fischer - arranger

References 

Herbie Mann albums
1970 albums
Embryo Records albums